Tom Piotrowski may refer to:
Tom Piotrowski (basketball) (born 1960), American basketball player
Tom Piotrowski (economist) (born c. 1960s), Australian economist

See also
Piotrowski